Double homeobox A pseudogene 9 is a protein that in humans is encoded by the DUXAP9 gene.

References 

Pseudogenes